Dóra Pásztory (born 4 April 1984) is a retired Hungarian Paralympic swimmer who specialized in the individual medley. She was born without her left forearm and three fingers on her right hand. After her retirement from swimming, she became a journalist.

References

1984 births
Living people
People from Nagyatád
Paralympic swimmers of Hungary
Hungarian journalists
Hungarian women journalists
Swimmers at the 2000 Summer Paralympics
Swimmers at the 2004 Summer Paralympics
Medalists at the 2000 Summer Paralympics
Medalists at the 2004 Summer Paralympics
Paralympic medalists in swimming
Paralympic gold medalists for Hungary
Paralympic silver medalists for Hungary
Paralympic bronze medalists for Hungary
S8-classified Paralympic swimmers